Transformers: Rescue Bots  (or simply Rescue Bots) is a toyline, story book series, and animated robot superhero children's television series based on toy manufacturer Hasbro's Transformers franchise. Rescue Bots is the successor of Transformers: Robot Heroes and is based on the same concept as the Marvel Superhero Adventures and Star Wars Jedi Force franchises. Rescue Bots mainly focuses on educating children regarding hazards and safety.

The original main group of Autobots who take part in Rescue Bots are Chase, Heatwave, Blades and Boulder.

Relating to other Transformers series/continuities, Rescue Bots features human and Autobot allies as well as a toy line.

The original toy line and the storybook series features the team of Chief Charlie Burns (Optimus Prime's and Hoist's partner), an adult Cody Burns (Heatwave's partner), Sawyer Storm (Blades' and Medix' Partner), Walker Cleveland (Boulder's partner), Billy Blastoff and Jack "Hunter" Tracker (Chase's partners), and Axel Frazier (Bumblebee's partner).

The TV series features Chief Charlie Burns (Chase's partner), Cody Burns as a child (Optimus Prime's and Salvage's partner), Dani Burns (Blades's partner), Kade Burns (Heatwave's partner), and Graham Burns (Boulder's partner), as well as Doc Greene and Francine Greene as supporting characters (who later in the series become temporary partners to the Autobot High Tide). Season 1 is available for streaming via Netflix. Hasbro has also made seasons 1–3 available digitally on iTunes and on YouTube through a paid subscription.

The trailer for the fourth season was released on January 22, 2016 which shows an older Cody Burns and a female rescue bot named Quickshadow. Season 4 first aired on April 23, 2016 and ended on October 22, 2016, lasted for four years. 104 episodes have been produced. As of its fourth season, Rescue Bots is the longest-running Transformers series, surpassing The Transformers, which aired for 98 episodes.

On June 6, 2017, it was announced that the series had ended production and would be succeeded by Transformers: Rescue Bots Academy. Though, the cast did not reprise their roles in the series.

Synopsis 
Set on the fictional island of Griffin Rock somewhere off the coast of Maine, the Rescue Bots (a group of Autobots designed for rescue missions) named Heatwave, Boulder, Blades, and Chase respond to Optimus Prime's message for any active Autobots in outer space to come to Earth. Coming out of a long stasis, the Rescue Bots learned what became of Cybertron and that they are one of the only Rescue Bot teams remaining. Deeming them too valuable for them to join the fight against the Decepticons, Optimus Prime partners them with the Burns Family composed of first response rescuers. Together, they learn teamwork and heroism alongside their human friends as they deal with various disasters while also getting themselves familiar with Earth's cultures.

Episodes

Broadcast and release 

A television series was produced independently from the earlier released storybooks, set in the same story continuity as Transformers: Prime and Transformers Robots in Disguise with occasional crossovers. The show aired on Hasbro's and Discovery's television network, Discovery Family. Rescue Bots is developed for television by Nicole Dubuc, Brian Hohlfeld, and Jeff Kline. The series had a sneak peek on December 17, 2011, and officially premiered on February 18, 2012. It premiered on Discovery Kids in India.

Home video release 
Shout! Factory have released several DVDs in the US, featuring random episodes:

Beyond Home Entertainment have released the first two seasons on DVD in Australia:

Miracle Media in the United Kingdom have rights for the first two seasons through Region 2, including most of Western Europe and the Middle East.

References

External links 
 
 Transformers: Rescue Bots on iTunes

Rescue Bots
2010s toys
2012 American television series debuts
2016 American television series endings
2010s American animated television series
2010s American comic science fiction television series
2012 Canadian television series debuts
2016 Canadian television series endings
2010s Canadian animated television series
2010s Canadian comic science fiction television series
American children's animated action television series
American children's animated adventure television series
American children's animated comic science fiction television series
American children's animated science fantasy television series
American children's animated superhero television series
American flash animated television series
Canadian children's animated action television series
Canadian children's animated adventure television series
Canadian children's animated comic science fiction television series
Canadian children's animated science fantasy television series
Canadian children's animated superhero television series
Canadian flash animated television series
English-language television shows
Animated television series about children
Television series by Hasbro Studios
Television series by DHX Media
Discovery Family original programming
Robot superheroes
Television shows set in Maine